Suraj Sharma (born 21 March 1993) is an Indian actor who made his debut in the 2012 film Life of Pi. Directed by Ang Lee, the film was adapted from the novel of the same name, and earned Sharma critical acclaim as well as a BAFTA Rising Star Award nomination. In 2014, he portrayed Aayan Ibrahim in season 4 of the Showtime series Homeland. From 2018 to 2020, he starred as Rakesh Singh in the CBS comedy-drama series God Friended Me.

Life and career
Sharma was born and brought up in a Malayali family in New Delhi, India. His father, Gokul Churai, is a software engineer from Thalassery, Malabar and a professional chess player, while his mother, Shailaja Sharma, is an economist from Palakkad, Kerala. He has a younger brother, Sriharsh Sharma, who has also acted in two films, and a younger sister, Dhruvatara Sharma. He attended Sardar Patel Vidyalaya secondary school, and later studied at St. Stephen's College, Delhi University. With no prior acting experiences, he auditioned along with his brother for the role of Piscine Molitor "Pi" Patel in Life of Pi (2012). Sharma went through several rounds of auditions before winning the title role, beating out 3,000 other young men. Director Ang Lee has stated that he selected Sharma primarily based on his expressive eyes and innocent appearance. According to him, Sharma had not only the emotion, but also the "look" of Pi. His "medium complexion" and "average build" were deemed perfect for the role. The film was met with critical acclaim, winning four Academy Awards; Sharma's performance received positive reviews, and he was nominated for the BAFTA Rising Star Award.

After filming Life of Pi, Sharma returned to studying philosophy at St. Stephen's College, with the intention of continuing to work in filmmaking in some capacity. He subsequently undertook a Bachelor of Fine Arts degree at New York University Tisch School of the Arts. In 2014, he portrayed Aayan Ibrahim, nephew of a terrorist, in season 4 of the Showtime political thriller series Homeland. That same year, he portrayed Rinku Singh in the sports biopic Million Dollar Arm. He then co-starred with Tony Revolori in the Indian comedy-drama Umrika, which premiered at the 2015 Sundance Film Festival. In 2016, he starred in the Mongolian-American adventure drama film Burn Your Maps. He has also portrayed the role of Kanan Gill in his first Bollywood venture, Anshai Lal's romance comedy Phillauri co-starring Anushka Sharma and Diljit Dosanjh. From 2018 to 2020, he starred as Rakesh Singh in the CBS comedy-drama series God Friended Me. In 2019, he appeared in the American science fiction black comedy slasher film Happy Death Day 2U, a sequel to Christopher Landon's 2017 film Happy Death Day. In the same year, he appeared as Hassan in Danish Renzu's Indian American English-language drama film titled The Illegal.

In May 2021, Sharma was cast in How I Met Your Mother spinoff series, How I Met Your Father led by Hilary Duff. In November 2021, Duff and the cast confirmed via social media accounts that the series will premiere on 18 January 2022. The series was released on 18 January 2022. On 15 February 2022, Hulu renewed the series for a 20-episode second season.

Filmography

Film

Television

Awards and nominations

See also
 Indians in the New York City metropolitan area

References

External links

 

1993 births
Indian male film actors
Indian male television actors
Living people
Male actors from New Delhi
21st-century Indian male actors